James Oakley may refer to:

 James Oakley (director), American film director, producer and writer
 James Oakley (politician), judge and county commissioner in Texas
 James Oakley (footballer) (1901–1972), English footballer
 James M. Oakley (1839–1887), American politician from New York
 James Oakley (Fair City), a character in Fair City